June 2013 Pakistan bombings was the series of terrorist attack in Pakistan on 30 June 2013. The attacks took place in Hazara Town, Quetta, in Peshawar and in Miranshah, North Waziristan which kills 52 and 119 others injured. The attacks came as the day when UK Prime Minister David Cameron visit Pakistan.

Attacks 
The bombings took place at three different areas of Pakistan. One attack near a Shiite Muslim mosque in Hazara Town, Quetta in which at least 28 people killed. Another attack near the Badhaber Police Station in Peshawar in which 18 people killed. Other in a check post in Miranshah, North Waziristan in which four security officers were killed.

References 

2013 murders in Pakistan
21st-century mass murder in Pakistan
Improvised explosive device bombings in Pakistan
Mass murder in 2013
Terrorist incidents in Pakistan in 2013
Crime in Khyber Pakhtunkhwa